{{Infobox artist
| name = Alberto Ziveri
| image = 
| imagesize = 
| caption = 
| birth_name = 
| birth_date =  1908
| birth_place = Rome, Italy
| death_date = 1990
| death_place = Rome, Italy
| nationality = Italian
| field = Painting
| training = Scuola Romana
| movement = Contemporary
| works        = The Notturni (Nocturnes) Series
Composizione (Composition, 1933)
Piazza Navona (1943)Postriboli (Brothels, 1945)The Fermate di tram (Tram stops) Series
| patrons =
| awards = IV Premio Quadriennale di Roma 
Premio Viareggio-Rèpaci
}}
Alberto Ziveri (1908–1990) was an Italian painter belonging to the modern movement of the Scuola Romana (Roman School). He is known for his urban landscapes and realist narrative scenes. His use of chiaroscuro in paintings such as Postribolo (1945) recalls the Settecento style.

Awards
IV Premio Quadriennale di Roma, 1943
Premio Viareggio-Rèpaci, 1989

See also
Scuola Romana
Expressionism
Guglielmo Janni

Notes

Exhibitions
XXVIII Biennale di Venezia, 1956Personale Ziveri, 1964, Galleria La Nuova Pesa, Rome 1964Ziveri: Anthologic Collection, Gallery of Rome 1984

Bibliography
M. Fagiolo, Alberto Ziveri, Turin 1988Suola Romana a Torino 1986-1989, ed. by M. Fagiolo & G. Audoli, Turin 1989
M. Fagiolo, F. Morelli, Ziveri, catalogue, Florence 1989
V. Rivosecchi, Alberto Ziveri. Taccuini di viaggio, Rome 1990
V. Rivosecchi, Piero della Francesca e il Novecento, catalogue by di M.M. Lamberti & M. Fagiolo, Venezia 1991, pp. 174 –177Roma sotto le stelle (Rome under the stars), catalogue by N. Vespignani, M. Fagiolo, V. Rivosecchi, I. Montesi, Rome 1994
General catalogue of the Galleria comunale d'arte moderna e contemporanea, Rome, ed. by G. Bonasegale, Roma 1995

External links
 Scheda dell'artista, on Scuolaromana.it''. Accessed 27/05/2011
 , video clip. Accessed 27/05/2011

1908 births
1975 deaths
20th-century Italian painters
20th-century Italian male artists
Italian male painters
Modern painters